Orconectes inermis testii, known as the unarmed crayfish, is one of two subspecies of the Northern cave crayfish (Orconectes inermis), along with Orconectes inermis inermis.

Distribution
It is endemic to Monroe County, Indiana in the United States, where it interbreeds to form intergrades with O. i. inermis.

References

Subspecies
Cambaridae
Cave crayfish
Crustaceans described in 1891
Endemic fauna of Indiana
Freshwater crustaceans of North America